Visa requirements for Yemeni citizens are administrative entry restrictions by the authorities of other states placed on citizens of Yemen. As of 2 July 2019, Yemeni citizens had visa-free or visa on arrival access to 33 countries and territories, ranking the Yemeni passport 104th in terms of travel freedom according to the Henley Passport Index.

Visa requirements map

Visa requirements

See also

 Visa policy of Yemen
 Yemeni passport
 List of nationalities forbidden at border

References and Notes
References

Notes

Yemen
Foreign relations of Yemen